Serpent Throne was an American instrumental stoner/doom metal band from Philadelphia, Pennsylvania, United States, that formed in 2005. The band has released four studio albums: Ride Satan Ride released in 2007 on the label Season of Mist, The Battle of Old Crow in 2009 on Vessel Records, White Summer•Black Winter in 2010 on Translation Loss Records, and Brother Lucifer in 2013 on Prophase Music.

Band members
 Demian Fenton – guitar (2005–2017)
 Don Argott – guitar (2005–2017)
 Sean-Paul Fenton – drums (2005–2017)
 Colin Smith – bass guitar (2005–2014)
 Joel Winter – bass guitar (2014–2017)

Discography
 Ride Satan Ride (2007)
 The Battle of Old Crow (2009)
 White Summer•Black Winter  (2010)
 Brother Lucifer (2013)

External links
 Serpent Throne on Facebook
Serpent Throne at Encyclopaedia Metallum
 

American doom metal musical groups
American stoner rock musical groups
Musical groups from Philadelphia
Musical groups established in 2005
Heavy metal musical groups from Pennsylvania